Michelle Lou is a composer and bassist.  She won the Rome Prize in 2018. She was a Radcliffe Fellow at Harvard in 2013. She was a Fulbright Fellow in Austria and is a visiting assistant professor of music at UC Santa Cruz.

Education 
She studied at University of California San Diego, Stanford University, Conservatorio G. Nicolini in Piacenza, Italy, and the University for Music and Performing Arts in Graz, Austria.

Many of her works are published by Berlin-based Edition Gravis.

References

Living people
Year of birth missing (living people)
American women composers
University of California, San Diego alumni
Stanford University alumni
21st-century American women